Antônio Pecci Filho (born July 6, 1946), better known as Toquinho, is a Brazilian singer and guitarist. He is well known for his collaborations, as composer and performer, with Vinicius de Moraes.

Childhood and musical studies
Toquinho was born in São Paulo, the son of Italian immigrants Diva Bondioli and Antonio Pecci. He has one brother, João Carlos Pecci. His paternal grandfather was from Toro and his paternal grandmother was born in Calabria; his maternal grandparents were from Mantua. As he was very short as a child, his mother used to call him "meu toquinho de gente" ("my piece of person"), which was the origin of his nickname.

His first guitar lessons were with Dona Aurora, a piano teacher who also knew how to play guitar. However, she could not continue to teach Toquinho. At age 14, he began lessons with Paulinho Nogueira and went on to study harmony with Edgar Gianulo, classical guitar with Isaias Sávio and orchestration with Léo Peracchi. He also studied with and befriended Oscar Castro-Neves.

Career
Initially playing in colleges, Toquinho's professional career took off in the 1960s at shows promoted by radio personality Walter Silva at the famous Paramount theater in São Paulo. He composed his first recorded song with Chico Buarque entitled "Lua Cheia" (Full Moon). His first big hit was composed in 1970 with Jorge Benjor, "Que Maravilha" (What a Wonder).

That same year he was invited by Vinicius de Moraes, co-writer of the worldwide hit "Garota de Ipanema" (The Girl from Ipanema), to participate in a series of shows in Buenos Aires, forming a solid partnership that would continue for 11 years and produce 120 songs, 25 records and over a thousand shows. After the death of Vinicius de Moraes in 1980, Toquinho went on to pursue a solo career, often performing with other talented musicians like Paulinho da Viola, Danilo Caymmi, Paulinho Nogueira and Chico Buarque.

Throughout his career, Toquinho composed songs for children, and recorded five albums for young audiences, including Arca de Noé (1980), with Vinicius de Moraes, and Casa de brinquedos (1983). Toquinho continues to record and play, and he remains popular in Brazil and Italy.

In 2021, his album Toquinho e Yamandu Costa - Bachianinha (Live at Rio Montreux Jazz Festival) (with Yamandu Costa) won the Latin Grammy Award for Best Instrumental Album.

Discography

1960s
 1966: O violão de Toquinho
 1969: La vita, amico, è l'arte dell'incontro

1970s
 1970: Toquinho
 1970: Vinicius de Moraes en "La Fusa" con Maria Creuza Y Toquinho
 1971: Como dizia o poeta... Música nova (with Vinicius de Moraes and Marilia Medalha)
 1971: Per vivere un grande amore
 1971: São demais os perigos desta vida... (with Vinicius de Moraes)
 1971: Toquinho e Vinícius
 1971: Vinicius + Bethania + Toquinho en La Fusa (Mar Del Plata)
 1972: Vinícius canta "Nossa Filha Gabriela"
 1973: O bem amado (Original soundtrack)
 1973: Poeta, moça e violão (with Vinicius de Moraes and Clara Nunes)
 1973: Botequim (with Gianfrancesco Guarnieri)
 1974: Boca da noite
 1974: Toquinho, Vinícius e amigos
 1974: Fogo sobre Terra (Original soundtrack)
 1974: Vinícius & Toquinho
 1975: Vinícius/Toquinho
 1975: O Poeta e o Violão (with Vinicius de Moraes)
 1976: La voglia, la pazzia, l'incoscienza, l'allegria
 1976: Il Brasile nella chitarra strumentale (Torino, Italy)
 1977: Toquinho tocando
 1977: The best of Vinicius & Toquinho
 1977: Tom, Vinícius, Toquinho, Miúcha
 1978: Toquinho cantando: Pequeno perfil de um cidadão comum
 1979: 10 anos de Toquinho e Vinícius

1980s
 1980: Sempre Amigos (with Paulinho Nogueira)
 1980: Um pouco de ilusão
 1980: A arca de Noé (with Vinicius de Moraes)
 1980: A Arca de Noé 2 (with Vinicius de Moraes)
 1981: Toquinho, la chitarra e gli amici
 1981: Doce vida
 1982: Toquinho ao vivo em Montreaux
 1983: Aquarela
 1983: Casa de brinquedos
 1984: Sonho dourado
 1984: Bella la vita
 1985: A luz do solo
 1986: Coisas do coração
 1986: Le storie di una storia sola
 1986: Vamos juntos: Toquinho Live at Bravas Club'86, Tokyo
 1987: Canção de todas as crianças
 1988: Made in coração
 1989: Toquinho in Canta Brasil
 1989: À sombra de um jatobá

1990s
 1990: Toquinho instrumental
 1992: El viajero del sueño
 1992: Il viaggiatore del sogno
 1992: O viajante do sonho
 1993: La vita è l'arte dell'incontro
 1994: Trinta anos de música
 1996: Toquinho e suas canções preferidas
 1999: Toquinho Paulinho Nogueira

Gallery

Bibliography 

 Gildo De Stefano, Il popolo del samba. La vicenda e i protagonisti della storia della brazilian popular music, Préface by Chico Buarque de Holanda, Introduction by Gianni Minà, RAI Television Editions, Rome 2005, 
João Carlos Pecci and Wagner Homem,  Toquinho, Histórias de canções, Texto Editores Ltda., Sao Paulo, 2010, .
 Gildo De Stefano, Saudade Bossa Nova: musiche, contaminazioni e ritmi del Brasil, Préface by Chico Buarque, Introduction by Gianni Minà, Logisma Editore, Florence 2017,

References

External links
 Official website

1946 births
Living people
Bossa nova singers
Bossa nova guitarists
Brazilian jazz singers
Brazilian jazz guitarists
Brazilian male guitarists
Música Popular Brasileira singers
Música Popular Brasileira guitarists
Brazilian people of Italian descent
Singers from São Paulo
People of Calabrian descent
Brazilian people of Lombard descent
People of Molisan descent
Latin Grammy Lifetime Achievement Award winners
Brazilian composers
Latin music composers
Male jazz musicians
Latin Grammy Award winners